Val da Camp is a valley in  Bernina District, Grisons, Switzerland.

References

External links

 
Poschiavo